The Minister for Health is the Ghanaian government official responsible for the Ministry of Health.

List of ministers

References

1957 establishments in Ghana
Politics of Ghana
Health